Pomatiinae is a subfamily of operculate land snails, terrestrial gastropod mollusks in the family Pomatiidae.

Genera 
Genera within the subfamily Pomatiinae include:

Cyclostoma Lamarck, 1899
Cyclotopsis Blanford, 1864
Ericia Partiot, 1848
Georgia Bourguignat, 1882
Guillainia Crosse, 1884
Leonia Gray, 1850
Lithidion Gray, 1850
Otopoma Gray, 1850
Pomatias Studer, 1789 - type genus of the family Pomatiidae
Tropidophora Troschel, 1847
Tudorella Fischer, 1885

References

External links

Pomatiidae
Protostome subfamilies